Countess of Devon is a title that may be held by a woman in her own right or given to the wife of the Earl of Devon. Women who have held the title include:

Countesses in their own right
 Isabel de Forz, suo jure 8th Countess of Devon (1237 — 1293)

Countesses by marriage
 Amice de Clare (c. 1220 – 1284)
 Margaret de Bohun, 2nd Countess of Devon (1311 — 1391)
 Margaret Beaufort, Countess of Devon (1409 — 1449)
 Catherine of York (1479 – 1527) 
 A. J. Langer (born 1974)